Tuchel is a German surname that may refer to the following notable people:
Günther Tuchel, West German slalom canoeist
Johannes Tuchel (born 1957), German political scientist
Thomas Tuchel,  (born 1973), German football manager

See also
 Tuchel, the German name for Tuchola, a town in Kuyavian-Pomeranian Voivodeship in northern Poland

German-language surnames